Wayne "Frosty Freeze" Frost (December 4, 1963 – April 3, 2008), also known as The Freeze To Please, was an American old school hip hop b-boy known as a member of the second generation of the hip hop/breakdancing group, Rock Steady Crew.

He was known for his comedic, acrobatic, and inventive style. His trademark move is known as "dead man drop", a move that he created accidentally by attempting a poorly executed backflip and landing on his back.

His was featured in movies such as Flashdance, Wild Style, Style Wars, and The Freshest Kids; he also appeared on the cover of The Village Voice in 1981. He was featured in early hip hop music videos such as Afrika Bambaataa and The Soulsonic Force's "Planet Rock" and Malcolm McLaren's "Buffalo Gals".

In 2004, he and several other members of The Rock Steady Crew were honored at the VH-1 Hip Hop Honors.

Frosty Freeze resided in New York City. He regularly made appearances at many hip-hop events throughout the New York metropolitan area and elsewhere in the country.

Death
He was stricken with an undisclosed illness during early 2008, went on life support on March 27, and died on April 3, 2008.

References

American breakdancers
People from the Bronx
1963 births
2008 deaths
20th-century American dancers